Godwin Kobby Bentil (born 30 January 2001) is a Ghanaian professional footballer who plays as a forward for French club Niort.

Professional career
Bentil joined the youth academy of Le Havre in 2018, from the Attram de Visser academy in Ghana. Bentil made his professional debut with Le Havre in a 3-1 Ligue 2 win over Guingamp on 12 September 2020.

On 1 September 2021, he signed a three-year contract with Niort.

Career statistics

References

External links
 
 HAC Foot Profile

2001 births
Living people
Footballers from Accra
Ghanaian footballers
Association football forwards
Le Havre AC players
Chamois Niortais F.C. players
Ligue 2 players
Championnat National 2 players
Championnat National 3 players
Ghanaian expatriate footballers
Ghanaian expatriates in France
Expatriate footballers in France